The Mount Olive Tribune was a weekly newspaper based in Mount Olive, North Carolina covering Southern Wayne and Northern Duplin Counties. Its final edition was published on June 29, 2022.

References

External links 
 Mount Olive Tribune website

Weekly newspapers published in North Carolina
Wayne County, North Carolina
Duplin County, North Carolina
1904 establishments in North Carolina
2022 disestablishments in North Carolina
Publications established in 1904
Defunct newspapers published in North Carolina